Krisztina Ambrus (born 24 August 1992) is a Hungarian table tennis player. Her highest career ITTF ranking was 105.

References

1992 births
Living people
Hungarian female table tennis players